John S. Watson (August 14, 1924 – June 15, 1996) was an American Democratic Party politician who served six terms in the New Jersey General Assembly, where he represented the 15th Legislative District.

Born in Camden, Watson served with the United States Merchant Marine fleet during World War II. In 1970, Watson became the first African-American elected to the Board of Chosen Freeholders in Mercer County, New Jersey. In 1977, he became the President of the Board. For 12 years, Watson was a member of the New Jersey State Assembly, where he served as Chairman of the Assembly Appropriations Committee.

The John S. Watson Institute for Public Policy located at the Rudolph V. Kuser Mansion on the campus of Thomas Edison State College in Trenton, New Jersey is named in his honor.

His daughter Bonnie Watson Coleman went on to serve in what was once his Assembly seat. She is now a member of the United States House of Representatives.

External links
State of New Jersey Executive Order No. 54: On the death of Assemblyman John S. Watson

1924 births
1996 deaths
Politicians from Camden, New Jersey
Politicians from Mercer County, New Jersey
African-American state legislators in New Jersey
County commissioners in New Jersey
Democratic Party members of the New Jersey General Assembly
American sailors
Thomas Edison State University
20th-century American politicians
United States Merchant Mariners of World War II
20th-century African-American politicians